Crambus jupiter is a moth of the family Crambidae. It is found in Ethiopia.

This species has a length of the forewings of 7.5 mm with a maximum width of 2 mm.

References

Endemic fauna of Ethiopia
Crambini
Moths of Africa
Moths described in 1963